Rolando Molina (?−23 October 2020) was a Chilean lawyer and football leader. A man close to Augusto Pinochet, in the 1980s he defined himself as an 'anticommunist that supports to the Polish workers and to the Afghan people'.

Among the supporters of Universidad de Chile, he is controversially remembered for wasting his investment in a meccano stadium that would be the team's complex. Similarly, there are different authors that point to the same thing, like Daniel Matamala and Carlos González Lucay. On the other hand, Molina is also remembered for having left a deficit of more than $100 million.

References

Further reading

External links
 List of ANFP presidents in ADN Radio

Year of birth missing
20th-century births
2020 deaths
20th-century Chilean lawyers
Presidents of the ANFP
University of Chile alumni
Chilean anti-communists
People from Santiago